Chater may refer to:

People
Arthur Reginald Chater (1896–1979), Royal Marines general
Dan Chater (1870–1959), British politician
David Chater (born 1953), British broadcast journalist
Elizabeth Chater (1910–2004), Canadian author of novels and poetry
Eos Chater (born 1976), Welsh violinist
Geoffrey Chater (1921–2021), English actor
Gordon Chater (1922–1999), Australian actor and comedian
Hilda Chater (1874–1968), Irish and English chess master
James Chater (born 1951), British composer and musicologist
John W. Chater, 19th-century English publisher, printer and bookseller
Kamel Chater (born 1972), Tunisian boxer
Keith Chater (born 1944), British microbiologist
Kerry Chater (born 1945), Canadian musician and songwriter
Paul Chater (1846–1926), British businessman in Hong Kong
Shirley Chater (born 1932), American nurse, educational administrator and government official
Tony Chater (1929–2016), British former newspaper editor and communist activist
Veronica Chater, American author
William Chater (1821–1880), English organist, composer, conductor and teacher

See also
Chaytor